The South Atlantic Conference (SAC) is a college athletic conference affiliated with the National Collegiate Athletic Association (NCAA) at the Division II level, which operates in the southeastern United States. The SAC was founded in 1975 as a football-only conference and became an all-sports conference beginning with the 1989–90 season.

The league currently sponsors 10 sports for men (football, cross country, soccer, basketball, wrestling, baseball, lacrosse, outdoor track & field, tennis, golf) and 10 sports for women (volleyball, cross country, field hockey, soccer, basketball, lacrosse, outdoor track & field, softball, tennis, and golf).

History

The distant forerunner of the South Atlantic Conference was the North State Intercollegiate Athletic Conference (NSIAC). The NSIAC was formed when the "Little Six", as it was called, broke from the North Carolina Intercollegiate Athletic Conference in 1930. The charter members included Appalachian State Teachers College (now Appalachian State University), Lenoir–Rhyne College (now Lenoir–Rhyne University), Atlantic Christian College (now Barton College), Catawba College, Guilford College, Elon College (now Elon University), and High Point College (now High Point University).

The North State continued to grow over the next 30 years, adding Western Carolina University (1933), East Carolina University (1947) and Pfeiffer College (now Pfeiffer University) (1960). A name change became necessary when the league accepted Newberry College as its first member from the state of South Carolina in 1961. The league took on the name Carolinas Intercollegiate Athletic Conference (CIAC) on May 20 of that year.

The CIAC saw several changes in the following years as East Carolina withdrew from the league in 1962. Appalachian State and Western Carolina followed in 1971 and 1976. All three landed in the Southern Conference (SoCon).

The South Atlantic Conference was founded in 1975 solely as a football conference. The league received its name from a contest in which Kurt Brenneman of Greensboro, North Carolina became the first to submit the SAC-8 moniker.

The SAC-8 consisted of Carson–Newman College (now Carson–Newman University), Catawba College, Elon College, Gardner–Webb College (now Gardner–Webb University), Lenoir–Rhyne College (now Lenoir-Rhyne University), Mars Hill College (now Mars Hill University), Newberry College, and Presbyterian College. Dr. Fred Bentley, of Mars Hill College, was named league president for its inaugural year, by a vote of the member institutions.

After the first season of play in the SAC-8, the Bears of Lenoir–Rhyne College captured the first football title.

In 1989, the league's 15th year of operation, the South Atlantic Conference became a comprehensive, multi-sport conference. Doug Echols was named the league's first Commissioner. That year the South Atlantic Conference sponsored 10 sports – football, men's and women's basketball, baseball, softball, men's soccer, volleyball, men's golf, men's and women's tennis. Later the conference grew to 14 championship sports by adding women's soccer (1990), men's and women's cross country (1993) and women's golf (1999). In 2013, the sports of men's and women's lacrosse and men's and women's track and field were added, increasing the number of championship sports to 18.

The South Atlantic Conference was composed of the same eight member institutions from 1975–76 until 1988–89, when Wingate College (now Wingate University) replaced Newberry College as the eighth member institution. Newberry College later re-joined the conference in the 1996–97 season.

In July 1998, Tusculum College (now Tusculum University) was admitted as a member of the league, and Lincoln Memorial University began play in the conference in the 2006–07 academic year. Brevard College was admitted to the SAC as a provisional member in 2007 and a full member in 2008.

In 2008, Echols retired after serving as Commissioner for 19 years and Patrick Britz was hired as the new Commissioner.

In July 2010, Anderson University became the league's 10th member. Three years later in July 2013, Coker College (now Coker University) and Queens University of Charlotte joined the conference. On April 13, 2018, UVA Wise (in full, the University of Virginia's College at Wise) announced that it was joining the South Atlantic Conference for the 2019-20 season. A more recent change to the conference membership was announced on April 5, 2019, when Limestone College, which had joined as a football-only member in 2017 and added field hockey to its SAC membership the next year, was announced as a new full member effective in 2020–21, the same time it became Limestone University.

The SAC and Conference Carolinas entered into a partnership in the 2018–19 school year by which the two leagues would operate as a single conference in field hockey and men's wrestling, with championships immediately conducted in both sports. The leagues agreed that the SAC would coordinate the field hockey championship, while CC would fill the same role for men's wrestling. Accordingly, all CC field hockey programs became SAC affiliates, and all SAC men's wrestling programs became CC affiliates. The SAC–CC alliance is officially branded as "South Atlantic Conference Carolinas".

A more recent change in conference membership was announced on November 17, 2020. Emory & Henry College, then in the Division III Old Dominion Athletic Conference, started a transition to Division II in July 2021 and began SAC competition in 2022.

In December 2021, the SAC and CC jointly announced that they would extend their existing partnership to include two women's sports, triathlon and wrestling, with triathlon competition starting in 2022–23 and wrestling in 2023–24. At the same time, both conferences agreed that after the 2021–22 school year, the SAC would become the only one of the two conferences to sponsor field hockey. The joint men's wrestling league will continue to operate through the 2022–23 season, after which both conferences will establish their own men's wrestling leagues.

The most recent change was officially announced on May 10, 2022, when the Division I ASUN Conference announced that Queens would leave the SAC to start a transition to D-I on July 1 as a new ASUN member.

Chronological timeline
 1975 - The South Atlantic Conference (SAC) was founded as a football-only conference. Charter members included Carson–Newman College (now Carson–Newman University), Catawba College, Elon College (now Elon University), Gardner–Webb College (now Gardner–Webb University), Lenoir–Rhyne College (now Lenoir–Rhyne University), Mars Hill College (now Mars Hill University), Newberry College and Presbyterian College, effective beginning the 1975 fall season (1975-76 academic year).
 1989 - Newberry left the SAC-8, effective after the 1988 fall season (1988-89 academic year).
 1989 - The SAC-8 added more sports to be a full-fledged athletic conference, effective in the 1989-90 academic year.
 1989 - Wingate College (now Wingate University) joined the SAC, replacing Newberry, effective in the 1989-90 academic year.
 1996 - Newberry returned to the SAC as an all-sports member, effective in the 1996-97 academic year.
 1996 - Elon left the SAC to join the Division I ranks of the National Collegiate Athletic Association (NCAA) as an NCAA D-I Independent (which would later join the Big South Conference as a provisional member, effective beginning the 1998-99 academic year), effective after the 1996-97 academic year.
 1998 - Tusculum College (now Tusculum University) joined the SAC, effective in the 1998-99 academic year.
 2000 - Gardner–Webb left the SAC to join the NCAA Division I ranks as an NCAA D-I Independent (which would later join the Atlantic Sun Conference as a provisional member, effective beginning the 2002-03 academic year), effective after the 1999-2000 academic year.
 2006 - Lincoln Memorial University joined the SAC, effective in the 2006-07 academic year.
 2007 - Presbyterian left the SAC to join the NCAA Division I ranks as an NCAA D-I Independent (which would later join the Big South as a provisional member, effective beginning the 2008-09 academic year), effective after the 2006-07 academic year.
 2007 - Brevard College joined the SAC as a provisional member, effective in the 2007-08 academic year.
 2010 - Anderson University joined the SAC, effective in the 2010-11 academic year.
 2013 - Coker University and Queens University joined the SAC, effective in the 2013-14 academic year.
 2017 - Brevard left the SAC to join the NCAA Division III ranks and the USA South Athletic Conference, effective after the 2016-17 academic year.
 2017 - Limestone College (now Limestone University) joined the SAC as an affiliate member for football, effective in the 2017 fall season (2017-18 academic year).
 2018 – Effective in the 2018–19 academic year, the SAC and Conference Carolinas (CC) established a partnership known as South Atlantic Conference Carolinas (SACC) for field hockey and men's wrestling. Under the partnership, the SAC operated the joint field hockey championship, with CC filling the same role for men's wrestling. Accordingly, Belmont Abbey College and Converse University joined the SAC as affiliate members for field hockey at that time. Limestone added that sport to its SAC affiliate membership.
 2019 - The University of Virginia's College at Wise (UVA Wise) joined the SAC, effective in the 2019-20 academic year.
 2020 - Limestone became a full SAC member effective in the 2020-21 academic year.
 2022:
 Emory and Henry College joined the SAC as a full member, and Barton College and Erskine College joined the SAC as football-only affiliates effective in 2022–23.
 Queens left the SAC for the D-I ASUN Conference.
 Effective with the 2022–23 academic year, field hockey is no longer part of the SACC partnership, with that sport now being fully governed by the SAC. The existing CC field hockey schools continue to compete as SAC affiliates. At the same time, women's triathlon was placed under the SACC umbrella.
 2023 – Starting in 2023–24, the SACC men's wrestling league will be dissolved and replaced by separate SAC and CC leagues. At the same time, SACC will add women's wrestling.

Member schools

Charter members
Newberry College left the SAC in 1989 (as a football member) and rejoined in 1996 (as an all-sport member). Wingate replaced Newberry College as the final member for the birth of the all-sports SAC in 1989. Former members Elon, Gardner–Webb, and Presbyterian were charter members of both the SAC-8 football era and the SAC all-sports era.

Current members
The SAC currently has 13 full members, with all but one being private schools.

Notes

Affiliate members
The SAC currently has six affiliate members, five private schools and one public school.

Notes

Former members
The SAC has five former full members, all private schools.

Notes

Membership timeline

Sports

Men's sponsored sports by school

Women's sponsored sports by school

Other sponsored sports by school

In addition to the above:
 Anderson and Tusculum treat their male and female cheerleaders as varsity athletes.
 Carson–Newman and Limestone treat their female cheerleaders (though not their male cheerleaders) and all-female dance teams as varsity athletes.
 Catawba treats its male and female cheerleaders and all-female dance team as varsity athletes. The school also sponsors a coeducational varsity eSports team.
 Coker has a coeducational varsity eSports team.
 Emory & Henry treats its cheerleaders and dancers as varsity athletes without regard to gender. The school's equestrian program is coeducational, and has chosen to not affiliate with the NCAA emerging sport status, partly because its former home of NCAA Division III has yet to place equestrian within the Emerging Sports umbrella. Instead, E&H riders compete in the Intercollegiate Dressage Association (IDA) and Intercollegiate Horse Shows Association (IHSA).
 Lenoir–Rhyne treats its male and female cheerleaders and all-female dance team as varsity athletes.
 Mars Hill sponsors a varsity cycling team, with separate men's and women's squads.

Conference facilities

References

External links